The 1998 Toyota Atlantic Championship season was contested over 13 rounds. All teams had to use Toyota engines. The KOOL Toyota Atlantic Championship Drivers' Champion was Lee Bentham driving for Forsythe Racing.

Calendar

Note:

Race 3 stopped earlier due to rain, originally scheduled over 50 laps.

Final points standings

Driver

For every race the points were awarded: 20 points to the winner, 16 for runner-up, 14 for third place, 12 for fourth place, 11 for fifth place, winding down to 1 point for 15th place. Lower placed drivers did not award points. Additional points were awarded to the pole winner (1 point) and to the driver leading the most laps (1 point). C2-class drivers were not able to score points in the main class.

Note:

Race 3 only one additional point awarded to Anthony Lazzaro, maybe because the race was abandoned.

Race 4 no additional point for the qualifying was awarded, because no session was held due to repair work on the track, starting lineup based on Friday morning practice times.

See also
1998 CART season
1998 Indy Lights season
1998 Indy Racing League season

External links
ChampCarStats.com

Atlantic
Atlantic Season, 1998
Atlantic Championship seasons
Atlantic